Shambhuprasad Tundiya is member of Bharatiya Janata Party and member of Rajya Sabha from Gujarat. He is one of the notable Mahants of Savgun Samadhisthan, Zanjarka.

Early life 
He was born in a small village named Zanjarka in Dhandhuka taluka of Ahmedabad district, Gujarat. He is the younger among 2 brothers. He finished his primary education in Government Primary School Dhandhuka and passed GPSC Exam and got a call letter as a Deputy Superintendent of Police (Dy. SP), though he refused the post and chose to become a Mahant at Savaiyanath Dham, Zanjark.

Early career 
He has been appointed trustee of Tirupati Balaji temple. In September 2017, Bhartiya Janata Party Gujarat declared him as the State President of BJP Morcha. During 2007–2012, he was the Member of Legislative assembly from Dasada constituency in Gujarat.

Political career 
Politically he was active since his youth and became Swayamsevak of the Rashtriya Swayamsevak Sangh and Vishwa Hindu Parishad. He became Member of Legislative Assembly from Dasada Vidhan Sabha constituency. In year 2014, he got elected for Rajya Sabha from Gujarat.

His organization skills were very important for party and he became President for state unit BJP SC Morcha in September 2017.

References

1970 births
Living people
Gujarat MLAs 2007–2012
Bharatiya Janata Party politicians from Gujarat
Rajya Sabha members from Gujarat

Indian Hindu religious leaders